The Opposite Sex is a 1956 American musical romantic comedy film shot in Metrocolor and CinemaScope. The film was directed by David Miller and stars June Allyson, Joan Collins, Dolores Gray, Ann Sheridan, and Ann Miller, with Leslie Nielsen, Jeff Richards, Agnes Moorehead, Charlotte Greenwood, Joan Blondell, and Sam Levene.

The Opposite Sex is a remake of the 1939 comedy film The Women. Both films are based on Clare Boothe Luce's original 1936 play.

Plot
Kay Hilliard, a former nightclub singer, discovers that her husband, theater producer Steven, is having an affair with showgirl Crystal Allen. Kay is the last to find out among her circle of gossiping girlfriends. Kay travels to Reno to divorce from Steve who then marries Crystal, but when Kay learns that Crystal is not faithful to Steve, she starts fighting to win her ex-husband back.

Cast

Production
Unlike the 1936 play and the 1939 film adaptation, The Opposite Sex includes musical numbers and features male actors who portray the husbands and boyfriends, whose characters were only referred to in the previous film and stage versions. This alters the structure and tone of the base storyline significantly.

Fay Kanin who cowrote the script with her husband Michael said the studio's argument was "you can't play a love scene alone." Michael said the studio "felt the movie audience would somehow be disappointed at not seeing men in it. After all, a man is a fact."

Fay Kanin thought the "manless world" of the play "was a stunt, an artificial trick, but it was accepted. But in a movie, which has the freedom to go out, the device would seem constrained and self conscious." Michael claimed "we only put in men to relieve the strain - and only when they are called for."

The Kanins gave the story a show business background to help justify it being turned into a musical, but "there are no big production numbers," according to Fay Kanin.

Elaine Stewart was promised Joan Collins' role before filming. Grace Kelly was supposed to have June Allyson's role, but she retired from acting before filming. MGM studio head Dore Schary envisioned Esther Williams in Allyson's role. According to her 2000 autobiography The Million Dollar Mermaid, Williams objected to Schary's casting suggestion, resulting in her suspension from the studio. Shortly after, on agent Lew Wasserman's advice, she left Metro after 14 years. Eleanor Parker was cast as Kay Hilliard but replaced by Allyson.

Jo Ann Greer dubbed Allyson's ballad "A Perfect Love".

In November 1955, Joe Pasternak was pursuing Marlene Dietrich and Miriam Hopkins. In December 1955, MGM announced the lead roles would be played by Allyson, Dolores Gray, Ann Miller (as the husband stealer), and Leslie Nielsen with filming to begin January 16, 1956. Jeff Richards was cast as Buck Winston in an effort by Metro-Goldwyn-Mayer to build on his success after starring in Seven Brides For Seven Brothers. In the 1939 version of The Women, actress Lucile Watson was featured in the cast as Mrs. Morehead, the loving, wise, and supportive mother of Norma Shearer's character Mary Haines. For the 1956 version, the role was eliminated, and a new character was created instead - Amanda Penrose, a playwright who served as Kay Hilliard's kind friend confidante. Ann Sheridan was cast in this part.

Barbara Jo Allen had the distinction of being in both the 1939 and 1956 versions—in the first film, she had a small, uncredited part as a receptionist; in the second, she played gossip columnist Dolly DeHaven.

This was Allyson's final film for MGM after having worked at the studio for nearly 15 years.

Reception
According to MGM records, the film earned $1,735,000 in the U.S. and Canada and $1,025,000 in other markets, resulting in a loss of $1,513,000.

Accolades
The film was nominated for a Golden Globe Award for Best Musical or Comedy Picture in 1957.

See also
 List of American films of 1956

References

External links

 
 
 
 
 

1956 films
1956 musical comedy films
1956 romantic comedy films
1950s American films
1950s buddy comedy films
1950s English-language films
1950s female buddy films
1950s romantic musical films
American buddy comedy films
American female buddy films
American films based on plays
American musical comedy films
American romantic comedy films
American romantic musical films
CinemaScope films
Comedy film remakes
Films about adultery in the United States
Films directed by David Miller
Films produced by Joe Pasternak
Films scored by Georgie Stoll
Films set in New York City
Films set in Reno, Nevada
Metro-Goldwyn-Mayer films
Musical film remakes
Remakes of American films
Romance film remakes